Enrique García may refer to:
 Enrique García (Argentine footballer) (1912–1969), Argentine football left winger
 Enrique García (gymnast) (born 1943), Mexican gymnast
 Enrique Burgos García (born 1946), Mexican politician
 Enrique García Ojeda (born 1972), Spanish rally driver
 Tet Garcia (1940–2016; Enrique Garcia Jr.), Filipino politician
 Kike García (Spanish footballer) (born 1989), Spanish football striker
 Kike García (Venezuelan footballer) (born 1982), Venezuelan football manager and player